Elmwood Township was a township in Golden Valley County, North Dakota, United States. The former township became the Elmwood Unorganized Territory.

The township was located on the western border of the county and the state. It bordered the following other townships in Golden Valley County:
 Henry – north
 Pearl – northeast corner
 Elk Creek – east
 Delhi – southeast corner
 Saddle Butte – south

References

Defunct townships in North Dakota
Townships in Golden Valley County, North Dakota
Townships in North Dakota